Radio IS or Радио ИС is a Bosnian local public radio station, broadcasting from Istočno Sarajevo, Bosnia and Herzegovina.

Radio IS was launched in 2017.

Frequencies
The program is currently broadcast at 2 frequencies:

 Sarajevo  
 Sokolac

References

External links 
 is-radio.com
 Communications Regulatory Agency of Bosnia and Herzegovina

See also 
List of radio stations in Bosnia and Herzegovina

Istočno Sarajevo
Radio stations established in 2017